Wang Bing (born January 2, 1978, in Liaoning) is a Chinese sprint canoeist who competed in the mid-2000s. He finished ninth in the C-1 500 m event at the 2004 Summer Olympics in Athens.

He also participated at the 2002 Asian Games in Busan, South Korea and won two gold medals alongside Yang Wenjun at C2 500 and 1000 metres. Wang later participated with Yang Wenjun at the 2006 Asian Games in Doha and won a silver medal.

References

Sports-Reference.com profile

1978 births
Canoeists at the 2004 Summer Olympics
Living people
Olympic canoeists of China
Canoeists from Liaoning
Asian Games medalists in canoeing
Canoeists at the 2002 Asian Games
Canoeists at the 2006 Asian Games
Chinese male canoeists
Medalists at the 2002 Asian Games
Medalists at the 2006 Asian Games
Asian Games gold medalists for China
Asian Games silver medalists for China